Kheyrabad (also Romanized as Kheyrābād) is a village in Hokmabad Rural District, Atamalek District, Jowayin County, Razavi Khorasan Province, Iran. At the 2006 census, its population was 468, in 121 families.

References 

Populated places in Joveyn County